Roya;, is a female name, of Persian origin. It is common in Iran, Afghanistan, and Azerbaijan.

Notable persons named Roya 
 Roya Arab, Iranian musician and archaeologist
 Röya (singer), Azerbaijani singer
 Roya Ramezani, Iranian designer and women's rights campaigner
 Roya Teymourian, Iranian actress

Persian feminine given names